Cancilla isabella is a species of sea snail, a marine gastropod mollusk in the family Mitridae, the miters or miter snails.

Description
The species was first described by William Swainson as Tiara isabella. The shell is slender, fawn coloured, unspotted, and marked by slender crowded, transverse, convex ribs with the interstices deeply cancellated.

Distribution
The type specimen was obtained from "New Holland", i.e. Australia.

References

Mitridae
Gastropods described in 1831